The sterile fungi, or mycelia sterilia are a group of fungi that do not produce any known spores, either sexual or asexual. This is considered a form group, not a taxonomic division, and is used as a matter of convenience. Because these fungi do not produce spores, it is impossible to use traditional methods of morphological comparison to classify them. However, molecular techniques can be applied to determine their evolutionary history.

References 

Mycology
Reproduction